Frédéric Anton (born 15 October 1964) is a French chef, Meilleur Ouvrier de France and three stars at the Guide Michelin since 2007. He was the chef of the restaurant Le Pré Catelan in the 16th arrondissement of Paris. He is now the chef at Le Jules Verne restaurant located in the Eiffel Tower (since 2020).

Life and career 
Frédéric Anton was born in Nancy but grew up in Contrexéville in the department of Vosges. He started his training course at the high school of Gérardmer in the same department.

His career began in 1984 with Gérard Veissiere at the Capucin Gourmand, a famous restaurant located in Nancy, and then in 1986 in Lille, where he worked with Robert Bardot. He then worked with chef Gérard Boyer at the Château des Crayères in Reims.

From 1988 to 1996, he worked for 7 years with chef Joël Robuchon at Jamin and avenue Raymond Poincaré in the 16th arrondissement of Paris, where he became the chef.

In 1997, the group Lenôtre gave him access to the restaurant Le Pré Catelan, a Napoléon III style restaurant owned by the famous pastry chef Gaston Lenôtre with a Belle Époque style dining room. The restaurant is located in route de Suresnes at the Bois de Boulogne.

In 1999, he obtained two Michelin stars and became Meilleur Ouvrier de France in 2000. In 2007, he received at age 43 his third Michelin star.

In 2011, he was also a judge in an episode of the Belgian show Comme un chef, on RTBF.

In 2018, in partnership with Sodexo, he took over the restaurant Le Jules Verne, located on the second floor of the Eiffel Tower.

On 13 February 2019 he appeared during an episode of season 10 of Top Chef.

In 2020, he won a first star for his Parisian restaurant Le Jules Verne, only 6 months after its opening.

MasterChef 
Since 2010, he is a member of the jury in the French version of MasterChef with chef Yves Camdeborde, journalist Sébastien Demorand, and Amandine Chaignot since 2013.

Honours 
2000 : Meilleur Ouvrier de France
2007 : Three stars at the Guide Michelin
2011 : Chevalier (Knight) of the Legion of Honour

Books 
Frédéric Anton, Chihiro Masui (illustrations : Richard Haughton), Anton : le Pré Catelan, Glénat, 2008, 351 pages
Frédéric Anton, Christelle Brua, Chihiro Masui (illustrations : Richard Haughton), Petits gâteaux, Chêne, 2011, 288 pages
Frédéric Anton, Christelle Brua, Chihiro Masui (illustrations : Richard Haughton), Pommes de terre, Chêne, 2012, 288 pages
Frédéric Anton, Christelle Brua, Chihiro Masui (illustrations : Richard Haughton), Tartes, Chêne, 2013, 288 pages

See also 
List of Michelin starred restaurants

References

External links 
 www.restaurant-precatelan.com 
 www.precatelanparis.com 

1964 births
Chefs from Paris
Head chefs of Michelin starred restaurants
Chevaliers of the Légion d'honneur
Businesspeople from Nancy, France
Living people